Di Costanzo is an Italian surname. Notable people with the surname include:

 Angelo di Costanzo (c. 1507 – 1591), Italian historian and poet
 Greg "Storm" DiCostanzo, a member of the duo Paul and Storm
 Luigi Di Costanzo (born 1982), Italian water polo player 
 Marco Di Costanzo (born 1992), Italian rower
 Mario Alberto di Costanzo Armenta (born 1962), Mexican economist and politician from the Labor Party
 Cuono "Nello" Di Costanzo (born 1961), Italian football manager and former player
 Richard A. DiCostanzo (born 1908), New York state senator 1943–1946

See also  
 Costanzo

Italian-language surnames